Vereslav (Viacheslav) Eingorn (born 23 November 1956, Odessa) is a Ukrainian chess grandmaster, coach and author. He was a member of the gold medal-winning Ukrainian team at the 2001 World Team Chess Championship.

Chess career
Born into a Jewish family in Odessa, he twice won the city championship (1977 and 1979). Eingorn played in several USSR Chess Championships, with his best result third place, behind Andrei Sokolov and Konstantin Lerner at Lvov in 1984. 
In 1986, he placed equal first with Sergey Smagin and Joseph Gallagher in the 2nd Cappelle-la-Grande open. He played for Ukraine in the Chess Olympiads of 1992, 2000 (bronze medal) and 2002. In 1987 he played in the Interzonal tournament at Zagreb, though failed to qualify for the Candidates Matches. He took part in the FIDE World Chess Championship 2002, but was knocked out in the first round by Krishnan Sasikiran.

His other tournament results include wins at Minsk 1983, Bor 1986 and Moscow 1986.

Chess strength
According to Chessmetrics, at his peak in May 1986 Eingorn's play was equivalent to a rating of 2713, and he was ranked number 12 in the world. His best single performance was at Minsk (URS Championship), 1987, where he scored 10.5 of 17 possible points (62%) against 2679-rated opposition, for a performance rating of 2745.

In the July 2009 FIDE list, he has an Elo rating of 2560, making him Ukraine's number 29.

Coach
Eingorn coached the Ukrainian Women's team to a gold medal in the 37th Chess Olympiad.

In 2007 he was awarded the title of FIDE Senior Trainer.

Notable games
Vereslav Eingorn vs Yaacov Zilberman, Oberwart op 1994, Wade Defense: General (A41), 1-0
Vereslav Eingorn vs Anatoli Karpov, URS-ch 1988, Queen's Gambit Declined: Three Knights Variation (D37), 1/2-1/2
Efim Geller vs Vereslav Eingorn, Riga ch-SU 1985, Spanish Game: Closed Variations (C92), 0-1
Vereslav Eingorn vs Viktor Kupreichik, Minsk 1987, Queen's Gambit Declined: Ragozin Defense (D38), 1-0
Vereslav Eingorn vs David Bronstein, Ch URS (select) 1978, Tarrasch Defense: Swedish Variation (D33), 1-0

Books

References

External links

Vereslav Eingorn at 365Chess.com
Viacheslav Eingorn - Products - New In Chess
Rating data for Vereslav Eingorn
Interview with Viacheslav Eingorn (November 2000)
Chessmetrics Player Profile: Viacheslav Eingorn

1956 births
Living people
Ukrainian Jews
Chess grandmasters
Chess Olympiad competitors
Ukrainian chess players
Ukrainian chess writers
Jewish chess players
Chess coaches
Sportspeople from Odesa
Odesa University alumni